The Italian Church of the Most Holy Redeemer is a Roman Catholic church located in Bucharest, Romania, at 28 Nicolae Bălcescu Boulevard. The Lombard Romanesque red brick edifice was built between 1915–1916 and consecrated by bishop Raymond Netzhammer in 1916. Owned by the Italian government, it is surrounded by apartment blocks. Services are held daily in Romanian at 6 PM, and on Sundays, in Polish at 9 AM, Romanian at 10 AM, Italian at 11 AM.

Notes

Churches in Bucharest
Historic monuments in Bucharest
Roman Catholic churches completed in 1916
20th-century Roman Catholic church buildings in Romania